Mote is both an English surname and a given name. Notable people with the name include:

 Ashley Mote (born 1936), English politician, former member of the European parliament
 C. Daniel Mote Jr. (born 1937), President of the National Academy of Engineering
 David Mote (born 1940), NASCAR driver
 Donald Mote (1900–1968), Justice of the Indiana Supreme Court
 Edward Mote (1797–1874), English pastor
 Frederick W. Mote (1922–2005), American sinologist and a professor of history
 George William Mote (1832–1909), English painter
 James Orin Mote (1922–2006), a bishop in Indiana, USA
 Kelley Mote (born 1923), American football player
 Lauren Mote (born 1997), English actress
 William Henry Mote (1803–1871), English stipple and line engraver
 Mote Terukaio, a politician in Kiribati

English-language surnames